Yevgeniy Levkin (born October 14, 1992) is a Kazakhstani ski jumper competing for Almaty Ski Club.

Career 
Levkin started ski jumping late and was not one of the best as young.

Levkin's best placement in Continental Cup is a 22nd place. He has also competed in the World Cup, three times. He has also tried to qualify seven times.

2011
In 2011 he took a pretty heavy fall in a World Cup qualification in Bischofshofen. Later 2011 he competed in the 2011 Asian Winter Games in Almaty. Levkin received a silver medal from the team large hill (K-125) competition. He did not do very well in the Large Hill individual competition but in the Normal hill competition Levkin won.

References

Kazakhstani male ski jumpers
Living people
1992 births
Asian Games medalists in ski jumping
Ski jumpers at the 2011 Asian Winter Games
Asian Games gold medalists for Kazakhstan
Asian Games silver medalists for Kazakhstan
Medalists at the 2011 Asian Winter Games